Baramba is a town and Vidhan Sabha constituency of Cuttack district, Odisha.

Badamba is a beautiful assembly constituency place located in the middle of Mahanadi River and the mountain ranges. There are many various natural tourist attraction spots along with the ancient temples that attract tourists from far and wide for their beauty and amazing legends.

This constituency includes Baramba block and
Narasinghpur block.

Elected Members

Thirteen elections were held between 1957 and 2009.
Elected members from the Baramba constituency are:

2019: (87): Debiprasad Mishra (BJD)
2014: (87): Debiprasad Mishra (BJD)
2009: (87): Debiprasad Mishra (BJD)
2004: (48): Debiprasad Mishra (BJD)
2000: (48): Debiprasad Mishra (BJD)
1995: (48): Debiprasad Mishra (Janata Dal)
1990: (48): Raja Saheb Trilochan Singh Deo (Janata Dal)
1985: (48): Lalit Mohan Mohanty  (Congress)
1980: (48): Samir Kumar Routray (Congress-I)
1977: (48): Raja Saheb Trilochan Singh Deo (Independent)
1974: (48): Raja Saheb Trilochan Singh Deo (Swatantra)
1971: (45): Trilochan Harichandan (Swatantra)
1967: (45): Pratap Chandra Patnaik (Orissa Jana Congress)
1961: (97): Bidyadhar Nayak (Congress)
1957: (68): Rani Saheba Kanaklata Debi (Ganatantra Parishad)

2019 Election Result

2014 Election Result

2009 Election Results
In 2009 election, Biju Janata Dal candidate Debiprasad Mishra defeated Indian National Congress candidate Surendra Kumar Nanda by a margin of 38,189 votes.

Notes

References

Assembly constituencies of Odisha
Politics of Cuttack district